Keele is a subway station on Line 2 Bloor–Danforth of the Toronto subway in Toronto, Ontario, Canada. It is located just north of Bloor Street West on the east side of Keele Street. The station opened in 1966, and was the western terminus of the line until 1968. Wi-Fi service is available at this station.

History
When the Bloor–Danforth line was opened in 1966 from Keele to Woodbine station, the Bloor streetcar line was dramatically shortened. It now traveled east from Jane Loop only as far as Keele Station; at the eastern end of the line, a separate Danforth streetcar was established, from Woodbine station to Luttrell Loop.
During this initial two-year period the trolleybuses and streetcars serving the station used separate loops (both within the fare-paid area), one near each of the station's entrances, so that passengers transferring between streetcars and trolleybuses had to walk along the subway platform. While the main (Keele Street) entrance and trolleybus loop had escalators up to the platform, the east (parking lot and Indian Grove) entrance and streetcar loop were provided with a moving ramp leading up to what is now the eastbound subway platform. After streetcar service to the station ended in 1968, the streetcar loop property was redeveloped and the moving ramp was sealed off. The former trolleybus loop is still used, by buses.

Installation of two elevators to make the station fully accessible commenced in August 2019. The construction was completed in July 2021, with Keele becoming the TTC's 53rd accessible station.

Subway infrastructure in the vicinity
Just east of Keele Street, the line emerges from a hillside, changing directly from tunnel to an elevated alignment on an enclosed bridge, then enters the station. The fully enclosed station crosses over both Keele Street and a parallel side street named Indian Grove. Just east of the station the line emerges onto an open viaduct, with a 187 space parking lot located underneath at 400 Indian Road. The line then continues at ground level beside the no longer active Vincent Subway Yard, before descending into the Dorval Portal as it continues to Dundas West Station.

Nearby landmarks

Nearby landmarks include High Park and Keele Junior Public School. The neighbourhood of The Junction is located north of the station.

Surface connections

TTC routes serving the station include:

References

External links

Line 2 Bloor–Danforth stations
Railway stations in Canada opened in 1966